is a Swedish classical music musician.

Biography 
Born on December 5, 1932, in Berlin, Germany to a Japanese mother, Toako Ohtsuki, a piano teacher and a Swedish father, Fritz Gösta Georgii-Hemming (1910–1986), an architect and cartoonist educated at the Bauhaus. His father, Fritz Georgii-Hemming (1886–1959), was a lawyer (including at the Svea Court of Appeal) and civil servant, appointed a knight of the Order of Vasa. The family name derives from the marriage of Hans Hemming (1853–1927), a provincial doctor and Anna Sofia Georgii (1850–1888).

Shortly after her family had settled at Shibuya the relationship of Hemming's parents deteriorated into domestic violence ending in a divorce. Hemming was educated in Japan and began learning to play the piano at a young age from her mother. She was identified as a child prodigy and performed her first concert at seventeen.

She went to Aoyama Gakuin Senior High School, Aoyama Gakuin Junior High School, Aoyama Gakuin Elementary School. She graduated from the Tokyo National University of Fine Arts and Music and began her professional career immediately. Hemming received many prestigious honors during this time, including the NHK-Mainichi Music Concour and the Bunka Radio Broadcasting Company Music Prize. She relocated to Germany at the age of 28 to study at the Berlin Institute of Music.

During a concert in Vienna in 1971, Hemming lost her hearing from a bout of high fever. She relocated again to Stockholm, Sweden to take advantage of its medical facilities. She performed many more concerts throughout continental Europe before returning to Japan in 1995.

A documentary that aired in 1999 raised public interest in her music. Her subsequent debut CD, La Campanella, sold over two million copies.

Hemming performed at Carnegie Hall in New York in June 2001. By 2002, Hemming had performed at every major population center in the world.

Recordings
In 2008, Hemming was signed by Domo Records for the world. In June 2009, Domo Records released five titles from her catalogue in the United States, including "Echoes Of Eternity"; "La Campanella"; "Nocturnes Of Melancholy", Live At Carnegie Hall and Liszt's "Piano Concerto No.1".

Four of her CDs have received the Classical Album of the Year award at the Japan Gold Disc Awards.
Ingrid Fujiko Hemming - The Piano Works Decca 2009
 download single works from Fujiko Hemming

References

External links 
 Fujiko Hemming
 Fujiko Hemming on facebook
 YouTube videos from Ingrid Fujiko Hemming

Living people
20th-century Swedish people
20th-century Japanese people
Swedish classical pianists
Swedish women pianists
Japanese classical pianists
Japanese women pianists
Swedish expatriates in Germany
Swedish expatriates in Japan
Swedish people of Japanese descent
Swedish people of Russian descent
21st-century classical pianists
Year of birth missing (living people)
Women classical pianists
Domo Records artists
21st-century women pianists